Hugh C. Anderson (February 2, 1851 – March 1, 1915) was an American lawyer, businessman and politician. He served as the long-term mayor of Jackson, Tennessee. He served as the Lieutenant Governor of Tennessee in 1915.

Early life
Hugh Crump Anderson was born on February 2, 1851, in McNairy County, Tennessee. His family moved to Jackson, Tennessee, in 1869.

Anderson graduated with a law degree from Cumberland University in Lebanon, Tennessee, in 1873. While in college, in 1870, he joined Sigma Alpha Epsilon.

Career
Anderson worked as a lawyer from 1873 to 1889.

Anderson joined the Democratic Party. He served as a member of the Tennessee House of Representatives from 1878 to 1881. He served as the Mayor of Jackson, Tennessee from 1884 to 1900. He served as the Lieutenant Governor of Tennessee in 1915.

Anderson served as the president of the First National Bank of Jackson, Tennessee. He was also the president of the Electric Light Company.

He was a member of the Knights of Pythias.

Personal life
Anderson married Lena Burdett.

Death
Anderson died on March 1, 1915, in Nashville, Tennessee.

References

External links

1851 births
1915 deaths
People from McNairy County, Tennessee
People from Jackson, Tennessee
Democratic Party members of the Tennessee House of Representatives
Mayors of places in Tennessee
Lieutenant Governors of Tennessee
Businesspeople from Tennessee
19th-century American politicians
20th-century American politicians
19th-century American businesspeople